Combust can refer to:
 Combust (astrological aspect), the obscuring of the unassisted viewing of a planet by the Sun's light
 Combustion, the exothermical chemical reaction